Lou Reed is the debut solo studio album by American rock musician Lou Reed, released in April 1972 by RCA Records, two years after he left the Velvet Underground. It was produced by Richard Robinson and Reed and features London session musicians as Reed's backing band, two of whom, Rick Wakeman and Steve Howe, were from the British progressive rock band Yes. Wakeman recalled that during the recording sessions, "the lights had to be out so nobody could see." The album was recorded at Morgan Studios in London, between December 1971 and January 1972.

With increasing interest in the Velvet Underground, Reed's debut album was highly anticipated, but was a commercial and critical disappointment, reaching only No. 189 on the Billboard 200. It comprises eight new recordings of then-unreleased Velvet Underground songs, and  two new songs, "Going Down" and "Berlin" (the latter was re-recorded by Reed as the title track for his 1973 album Berlin).

Track listing

Cross-reference
Eight tracks from Lou Reed were, at one point, originally performed by The Velvet Underground. These recordings have been released on various compilations and live albums, which have been catalogued below.

Tour
On the album's tour, which lasted two legs between June 9th and November 2, 1972, Reed was backed by The Tots. The Tots featured no shared personnel with the album and consisted of Vinny Laporta and Eddie Reynolds on guitar, Bobby Resigno on bass, and Scottie Clark on drums. This backing group would also play on the Transformer tour and perform on the American Poet live album.

Personnel
Credits are adapted from the Lou Reed liner notes.

Musicians
 Lou Reed – vocals; guitar
 Caleb Quaye – electric and acoustic guitars; piano
 Steve Howe – electric guitar
 Paul Keogh – electric and acoustic guitars
 Rick Wakeman – piano
 Les Hurdle – bass guitar
 Brian Odgers – bass guitar
 Clem Cattini – percussion
 Kay Garner – harmony vocals
 Helene Francois – harmony vocals

Production and artwork
 Richard Robinson – producer
 Lou Reed – producer
 Mike Bobak – engineer
 Tom Adams – cover art
 Ronn Campisi – photography

References

External links
 

Lou Reed albums
1972 debut albums
RCA Records albums
Albums recorded at Morgan Sound Studios